Test Aankoop (Dutch) or Test Achats (French) is a Belgian non-profit consumer organization which promotes consumer protection. It was founded in 1957 and publishes research in a subscription magazine.

History
Test Achats was founded by Louis Darms in November 1957 as the Association des Consommateurs (French) / Verbruikersunie (Dutch). In 1960 it was one of the founders of the organization now called Consumers International.

Test Achats is a founding member of International Consumer Research & Testing.

In 1987 Test Achats formed partnerships with three other consumer organizations with the intention of coordination comparative product testing in each country. Those organizations are the Comitato Difesa Consumatori in Italy, the Organization de Consumidores y Usuarios in Spain, and the Associação Portuguesa para a Defesa do Consumidor in Portugal.

The organization was a party to a 2011 lawsuit, Test-Achats vs Council of Ministers, in which it advocated for an end to using gender as a basis for determining insurance rates.

References

External links
 (in Dutch)
 (in French)

Consumer organisations in Belgium
Members of Consumers International